This is the list of Winter Universiade records in short track speed skating maintained by FISU, current after the 2023 Winter World University Games.

Men

Women

Mixed

References

Short track speed skating
Records
Speed skating-related lists